Meetin' Here is an album by saxophonist Curtis Amy and organist Paul Bryant recorded in 1960 for the Pacific Jazz label.

Reception

The contemporaneous DownBeat reviewer stated: "The overall unit feel is excellent – this group settles into a tune and cooks. The solos flow easily and without hesitation out of the ensemble and back in again. But the rating is held down partly by Jones and Miller, who are not consistently effective". AllMusic rated the album with 3 stars.

Track listing
All compositions by Curtis Amy except as indicated
 "Meetin' Here" (Onzy Matthews) - 7:04
 "Early in the Morning" - 6:46
 "If I Were a Bell" (Frank Loesser) - 6:02
 "One More Hamhock Please" - 7:59
 "Angel Eyes" (Matt Dennis, Earl Brent) - 6:18
 "Just Friends" (John Klenner, Sam M. Lewis) - 4:10

Personnel 
Curtis Amy - tenor saxophone
Paul Bryant - organ
Roy Brewster - valve trombone 
Clarence Jones - bass
Jimmy Miller - drums

References 

1961 albums
Pacific Jazz Records albums
Curtis Amy albums